Quảng Minh may refer to several rural communes in Vietnam, including:

Quảng Minh, Thanh Hóa, a commune of Sầm Sơn
Quảng Minh, Quảng Bình, a commune of Ba Đồn
Quảng Minh, Quảng Ninh, a commune of Hải Hà District
Quảng Minh, Bắc Giang, a commune of Việt Yên District

See also
Quang Minh (disambiguation)